Sargocentron macrosquamis, the big-scale squirrelfish, is a species of squirrelfish belonging to the genus of Sargocentron. It can be found in the Western Indian Ocean, from the Red Sea to Mozambique, and in Seychelles, Maldives and the Chagos Islands.

References

macrosquamis
 Fish of the Indian Ocean